Kolonia Wysoki Małe  (till December 31, 2000 as at Wysoki-Kolonia) is a village in the administrative district of Gmina Bogoria, within Staszów County, Świętokrzyskie Voivodeship, in south-central Poland.

The village has a population of  111.

Demography 
According to the 2002 Poland census, there were 94 people residing in Kolonia Wysoki Małe village, of whom 52.1% were male and 47.9% were female. In the village, the population was spread out, with 28.7% under the age of 18, 31.9% from 18 to 44, 18.1% from 45 to 64, and 21.3% who were 65 years of age or older.
 Figure 1. Population pyramid of village in 2002 — by age group and sex

References

Villages in Staszów County